Discopygiella is a genus of flies in the family Dolichopodidae. It is distributed in the Neotropical realm.

Species
Discopygiella chiapensis Robinson, 1965 – Mexico, Panama
Discopygiella discolor Robinson, 1965 – Mexico, Panama
Discopygiella maculata Robinson, 1975 – Dominica
Discopygiella setosa Robinson, 1965 – Mexico
Discopygiella xerophila Robinson, 1965 – Mexico

References

Peloropeodinae
Dolichopodidae genera
Diptera of North America
Taxa named by Harold E. Robinson